is a former Japanese football player.

Playing career
Kagami was born in Saitama on November 21, 1974. After graduating from Aoyama Gakuin University, he joined the Japan Football League club Tokyo Gas (later FC Tokyo) in 1997. He played often as second striker and the club was promoted to the new J2 League in 1999. Although his opportunity to play decreased in 1999, the club won second place and was promoted to the J1 League in 2000. However he did not play much in 2000. In August 2000, he moved to the J2 club Oita Trinita on loan and played often as a regular player. In 2001, he returned to Tokyo, but played less than Clesly Guimarães (a.k.a. Kelly). In 2002, he moved to the J2 club Kawasaki Frontale on loan. He played as a substitute midfielder. In October 2002, he returned to Tokyo. However he still did not play much and retired at the end of the 2003 season.

Club statistics

References

External links

j-league.or.jp

1974 births
Living people
Aoyama Gakuin University alumni
Association football people from Saitama Prefecture
Japanese footballers
J1 League players
J2 League players
Japan Football League (1992–1998) players
FC Tokyo players
Oita Trinita players
Kawasaki Frontale players
Association football midfielders